He Jia (born 16 August 1951) is a former Chinese footballer.

Club career
He was born in 1951 in Guangzhou, Guangdong. He began his career at Guangdong. In 1979, He captained Guangdong in the inaugural Guangdong–Hong Kong Cup, scoring in the second leg. In 1982, Jia left Guangdong, moving to Hong Kong in the process. Following the influx of mainland Chinese players into the Hong Kong First Division, He joined South China in 1983.

International career
On 15 June 1975, He made his debut for China in a 1–0 win against North Korea. He played three times for China at the 1976 AFC Asian Cup, scoring once. On 6 October 1977, He scored the opening goal against the United States in China's first game of their first tour to the Western Bloc.

International goals
Scores and results list China's goal tally first.

References

1951 births
Footballers from Guangzhou
Association football midfielders
Chinese footballers
China international footballers
Guangdong Winnerway F.C. players
South China AA players
Hong Kong First Division League players
Chinese expatriate footballers
Expatriate footballers in Hong Kong
Chinese expatriate sportspeople in Hong Kong
1976 AFC Asian Cup players
Footballers at the 1978 Asian Games
Medalists at the 1978 Asian Games
Asian Games bronze medalists for China
Asian Games medalists in football
Living people